Abandoned is the tentative title of an upcoming survival horror game being developed and published by Blue Box Game Studios, an independent video game company based in The Netherlands. Described as a "cinematic horror survival shooter" featuring "realistic" gameplay mechanics, Abandoneds premise centres around Jason Longfield, who must escape a forest after being kidnapped. A playable teaser of Abandoned, titled Abandoned: Prologue, is also in development and is planned to be released before the main game.

Originally announced as a PlayStation 5 exclusive title in April 2021, Abandoned drew significant media attention and hype due to the game trailer's stylistic similarities to Silent Hill and Metal Gear Solid, leading to speculation that Hideo Kojima was involved in the game's development. These rumours were discredited by Blue Box, its CEO Hasan Kahraman and later by Kojima himself.

Abandoneds development has been troubled, with the game's concept and design being changed multiple times, and its gameplay trailer and release date were both repeatedly pushed back before Blue Box indefinitely suspended any tentative release dates for Abandoned and the Prologue in March 2022. Despite this, Blue Box has stated that Abandoned is not cancelled, and both games will be released "when [they are] ready". A Windows version of Abandoned is intended to be produced "eventually". However, the lack of substantive updates have led to accusations that the game is vaporware.

Premise 
The original premise of the game, as shown in the game's initial PlayStation Blog reveal in April 2021, follows Jason Longfield, a man who wakes up in a forest after being kidnapped, but does not know the reason why. He finds out that he being brought there for "a dark purpose", and then has to fight for his survival against a cult and its leader, Jason's estranged older brother, and escape. Along the way, Jason will meet and team up with other characters and companions, but at the end of the game Jason must decide between fighting against, or joining, the cult and his brother. However, this premise is subject to change, as in April 2022 Hasan Kahraman has announced that the game's concept has changed.

Gameplay 
Kahraman initially described Abandoned as a first-person "cinematic horror survival shooter" game, but later described it as just a "survival shooter" featuring horror elements: "It has some horror elements in it but it's not really a horror game. It's not what people think – that it's Silent Hill". While the game was initially designed to be open world, it has since been developed into linear gameplay. The gameplay is also supposed to be a "realistic shooter" compared to action games; whereby every action the player performs in the game has an effect; for example, if the player makes their character sprint, they will be out of breath and their aim accuracy will decrease. Also, if the character is agitated or afraid, they would become nervous, etc. He also said that the game utilises motion-capture technology, which will affect how the player will take damage.

Blue Box Game Studios 
Blue Box Game Studios (stylised as BLUE BOX) is an independent Dutch video game company founded in April 2014 by Hasan Kahraman. According to the company's website, the word "Blue" in "Blue Box" stands for "Best Level User Experience", rather than the colour.

Prior to working on Abandoned, Blue Box had released or attempted to release several games, such as Rewind, The Whisperer, and  Tales of the Six Swords, but all of these have been either cancelled before a demo or teaser has been released, never given a full release, or pulled from release due to them not working as intended on mobile devices.

The last game made before the announcement of Abandoned was The Haunting: Blood Water Curse, a horror game that Kahraman described as a "western version of Fatal Frame." An early access version of the game, released on December 23, 2020, received negative Steam reviews due to its broken nature. Subsequently, Blue Box has decided to not premier any games in early access since. Progress on the game's Steam page has not been updated since March 2021. Blue Box has stated on their website FAQ that the game is not related in any way to Abandoned. In August 2021, Kahraman said in an interview to IGN that The Haunting would be released for free alongside Abandoned, when the aforementioned game is completed.

Development

April – June 2021: Announcement and Hideo Kojima involvement rumours 

Abandoned was announced by Blue Box on April 7, 2021 via the PlayStation Blog, along with a minute-long teaser trailer. The trailer contains various shots of a winter forest, including shots featuring an abandoned building with graffiti reading "Kill the Trespasser" written on it, and a sign reading "God's town".

After the game's announcement, Abandoned attracted significant media attention from users and media outlets, as it was believed that Japanese video game designer Hideo Kojima (and/or Kojima Productions) was involved in the creation of the game, rumoured to be a new Silent Hill entry. This theory, also known as the "Blue Box Conspiracy" or "Kojima Conspiracy", was pushed by the fact that Hasan Kahraman's name shared the same first initials as Hideo Kojima, leading to the belief that Blue Box and "Hasan Kahraman" was a pseudonym for Kojima, in the vein of the promotional stunt Kojima performed for the 2015 game Metal Gear Solid V: The Phantom Pain, where he went under the pseudonym "Joakim Morgen" and had a fake Swedish game company called "Moby Dick Studio", and also to "7780s Studio", another fake company of Kojima's, which created the P.T. demo teaser for the cancelled 2015 game Silent Hills. Furthermore, it was discovered that "Kahraman" translated into Turkish as "Hideo". The speculation surrounding Kojima's involvement led to the creation of a dedicated subreddit on Reddit, r/TheBlueBoxConspiracy, by fans of Silent Hill to discuss the rumours. In response to the rumours, Blue Box Game Studios released a statement the following day after the game's announcement on April 8, 2021 on their website disavowing their connection to Kojima or Konami, who owns the rights to the Silent Hill franchise. This was further disproved by VentureBeat journalist Jeff Grubb, who revealed that Kojima was in talks with Microsoft/Xbox for his next game, and not PlayStation.

However, despite this statement, rumours over the involvement of Hideo Kojima in Abandoned persisted due to various tweets from Blue Box linking the game to Kojima's Metal Gear and Silent Hill franchises. For example, a tweet posted on June 15, 2021 seemingly referring to Silent Hill, read; "Guess the name: Abandoned = (First letter S, Last letter L)". Blue Box subsequently apologized for the tweet and said it had been misunderstood. A similar occurrence happened on July 27, 2021, where Blue Box shared a teaser for Abandoned with a blurred image of a person with an left-eyepatch in the background. Many compared the person in the image to Solid Snake, the protagonist of Kojima's Metal Gear Solid series, creating speculation that Abandoned was actually a Metal Gear Solid game. In an interview to NME, Kahraman clarified that this was an image of the game's main villain, and not Solid Snake. "The eyepatch. Everyone immediately linked it to Solid Snake. But I was like, 'People think it's Silent Hill so it wouldn't make sense if people linked it with Snake'." Due to the repeated rumours, Kahraman had to speak to Konami to clear up his involvement.

Hideo Kojima remained quiet on the rumours surrounding his involvement in Abandoned until he addressed and discredited them during an interview on his Brain Structure podcast with Geoff Keighley on November 3, 2022. Kojima said that he was "surprised" by the extent of the rumours, which he did not take seriously until users began sending deepfaked images and messages to him en masse, and described the situation as a "nuisance". Kojima stated that he had continuously been sent these images for "nearly two years". He also stated that he had never met Kahraman, and that he "wouldn't do the same thing twice" with regards to his "Moby Dick Studio" stunt.

June – August 2021: Realtime Experience app 
After the announcement of the game, Blue Box  revealed plans to release a "Realtime Trailers" (later renamed Realtime Experience) app to the PlayStation Store. The app was touted as Abandoneds hub for "interactive trailers", where teasers and trailers of Abandoned and its gameplay would be revealed, with reveals to take place during Summer 2021. It was designed to render the cutscenes "in real time", and act as a showcase for the game's graphics and use of Unreal Engine 5. The app was scheduled for release on June 20; however, due to localisation issues, it was delayed to June 25 and then to August 10, 2022. Due to technical issues, the Realtime Experience app immediately crashed and was unusable on day one, with a patch for the app being uploaded three days later.

After being patched, the Realtime Experience app was criticised for only containing a five-second render of a man walking on a wooden floor, and the fact this render had already been teased on Blue Box's Twitter account a few days prior to its release. Hasan responded to the criticism to explain why the trailer was so short;"What we had in mind was actually a 30-second teaser with more content in it, but then we had engine issues. And we had to make sure that we could solve this in time, but we didn't have enough time. We realized that this was going to take much longer than just three days, because our initial plan was to release it before the weekend. So we had to cut down everything and then just leave it with just four or five seconds of footage."In an interview to NME on August 16, 2021, Hasan later called the Realtime Experience release as "a big disaster", and blamed its failures on the team's use of Unreal Engine 5, which Hasan described as "not recommended" for purpose due to its early access state. In the same interview, Hasan also said he would be showing the trailer at Gamescom in a weeks time (August 25, 2021); however, this appearance never materialised.

August 2021 – March 2022: Abandoned: Prologue 
In August 2021, Kahraman announced that the game would receive a "playable prologue", which would act as a backstory/introduction to the main Abandoned game. Hasan intends to use the Prologue to fund the development of Abandoned upon its release. While initially plotted as a teaser, Hasan later clarified that Abandoned: Prologue was now completely separate from the final game.

On October 17, 2021, Blue Box released a statement on Twitter revealing they had been suffering increased levels of harassment, doxxing and death threats being directed towards Blue Box staff members online and in real life. While Blue Box did not specifically state a reason, the harassment has been attributed to the game's repeated delays and the Blue Box Conspiracy. "We are fully aware of the negative situation that we have created and we truly understand your frustration, But what we don't understand are the death threats." The company also said they would be taking legal action against people who were harassing the company online or in real life.

March 2022 – present: Indefinite delay, asset leak and GameSpot investigation 

On March 31, 2022, Blue Box released a statement to Twitter announcing that Abandoned: Prologue had been delayed indefinitely, with Kahraman saying that it will come out whenever it is ready. Following this announcement, Blue Box Game Studios deleted a number of past tweets regarding future plans of Abandoned, leading to several publications to believe development on the game has stalled, or that it had been cancelled entirely. Kahraman denied these claims, and said it was due to the game's concept changing, though also stating that he regretted the decision to delete the tweets. On May 16, 2022, some of Abandoneds assets were leaked via Reddit, showing the game's concept had changed drastically from how it was originally characterized into a political thriller.

On June 3, 2022, GameSpot published an investigative report which accused Kahraman of "toxic" activities on a private chat room revolving around the game, in which he revealed scant development information but attempted a romantic advance on one of his artists, who later left the group, allowed a 12-year-old to insult other members with no consequences, and forced others to play Rainbow Six Siege with him. Leaked development assets also had a Silent Hill 5 logo on them, indicating that he sought to trick people into believing Abandoned was part of the Silent Hill series. Others close to Kahraman claimed that little to nothing of the game exists, with the game shifting genres numerous times, and that even the playable prologue was unlikely to be finished, making it largely a hoax.

Abandoned troubled development was compared to that of the upcoming 2023 video game The Day Before.

References 

Indie video games
PlayStation 5 games
Single-player video games
Survival horror video games
Unreal Engine games
Vaporware video games
Windows games